Benny & Jolene is a 2014 British comedy film written, produced and directed by Jamie Adams, and starring Charlotte Ritchie & Craig Roberts.

Cast
Craig Roberts as Benny
Charlotte Ritchie  as Jolene
Dolly Wells as Rosamund
Rosamund Hanson as Nadia

Reception
The film has a 23% rating on Rotten Tomatoes.  Angie Errigo of Empire awarded the film two stars out of five.  Terry Staunton of Radio Times awarded the film two stars out of five.  Time Out awarded the film two stars out of five.  Donald Clarke of The Irish Times awarded the film one star out of five.

References

External links
 
 

British comedy films
2014 comedy films
2010s English-language films
Films directed by Jamie Adams
2010s British films